Abdallah al-Qahdi is a Yemeni Brigadier in the Yemeni army. He quit his position as a senior military general from Aden over the 2011 Yemeni uprising.

References 

Yemeni military officers
Living people
Year of birth missing (living people)